Sergei Aleksandrovich Filippov (born 29 January 1967) is a former Russian football player.

Club career
He made his Russian Premier League debut for FC Rostselmash Rostov-on-Don on 29 March 1992 in a game against FC Shinnik Yaroslavl. He also played in the RPL for Rostselmash in 1993.

External links
 

1967 births
Living people
Soviet footballers
Russian footballers
FC Rostov players
Russian Premier League players
Association football defenders
FC Torpedo Moscow players
FC Spartak Ryazan players